William King B.D. (died 23 September 1590) was a Canon of Windsor from 1572 to 1590

Career
He was a King's Scholar at Eton College from 1544 to 1548, and then studied at King's College, Cambridge, where he graduated BA in 1553, MA in 1556 and BD in 1570.

He was appointed:
Rector of Howick, Northumberland 1560–1566
Archdeacon of Northumberland 1561–1566
Prebendary of Canterbury Cathedral 1565–1590
Vicar of Appledore, Kent 1568–1576
Rector of Kingston, Kent 1569–1573
Chaplain to Queen Elizabeth
 
He was deprived of his archdeaconry in 1566 due to continual absence.

He was appointed to the ninth stall in St George's Chapel, Windsor Castle in 1572, a position he held until 1590.

Notes 

1590 deaths
Canons of Windsor
Archdeacons of Northumberland
People educated at Eton College
Alumni of King's College, Cambridge
Year of birth missing